Tariq ibn Amr al-Amawi (644–693) was an Umayyad commander and governor of Medina in 691/92–693. He was a mawla (non-Arab Muslim convert) and freedman of Caliph Uthman. He later entered the service of the Umayyad caliph Abd al-Malik and took part in the suppression and execution of the latter's kinsman and claimant to the throne, Amr ibn Sa'id ibn al-As in 689. 

Tariq was deployed toward Zubayrid Medina by Abd al-Malik with orders to station his troops between Ayla and Wadi al-Qura. He was instructed to guard the southern approaches of Umayyad Syria, check the influence of the Zubayrid governors of Medina, Fadak and Khaybar and otherwise remain on standby. One of Tariq's first actions was his dispatch of horsemen against the Zubayrid commander Abu Bakr ibn Abi Qays who had previously killed an Umayyad commander and his men. A 2,000-strong Zubayrid contingent from Basra was sent against Tariq in response, but the latter routed them.

Following the defeat of Mus'ab ibn al-Zubayr, the governor of Iraq for his brother, rival caliph Abd Allah ibn al-Zubayr, in 691, Abd al-Malik appointed Tariq governor of Basra. This appointment became short-lived, however, when the caliph dispatched Tariq at the head of 5,000 Syrian troops to assist in the siege of Ibn al-Zubayr by al-Hajjaj ibn Yusuf in Mecca. On the way there from Iraq, Tariq captured Medina from its Zubayrid governor before becoming al-Hajjaj’s second-in-command at Mecca.

References

Bibliography

7th-century Muslims
Umayyad governors of Medina
People of the Second Fitna
Generals of the Umayyad Caliphate
7th-century Arabs